Shoaib Mohammad (born 8 January 1961) is a former Pakistani cricketer who played in 45 Tests and 63 ODIs from 1983 to 1995.Shoaib is the son of former Pakistani cricketer Hanif Mohammad. Shoaib was a right-handed batsmen who represented the country until the mid-1990s. He is currently involved in development of cricket in Pakistan and is coaching and taking trials on behalf of Pakistan Cricket Board. On February 11, 2014, he was appointed the fielding coach of the national team. His son Shehzar Mohammad is a right-handed batsman and wicket-keeper for Pakistan International Airlines.

Test career
Shoaib Mohammad started his Test career in 1983 against India at Jalandhar, but he could not score much in this Test. He also managed to score only 9 runs in an innings. He scored 80 runs against England next year. At the end of the year, he scored 31/34 against New Zealand in Karachi. Scored his first century when he scored 101 runs. Pakistan made 487/9 in their first innings. Kris Srikkanth 123, Dilip Vengsarkar 96, Sunil Gavaskar 91, Mohinder Amarnath 89. The hosts scored 527/9 in the second innings. Shoaib Mohammad scored 45 runs in the second innings. His failure in the last Tests in Kolkata and Jaipur was astonishing.With the exception of a half-century at Birmingham during the 1987 tour of England, he was unable to play a significant innings

Career statistics
Shoaib Mohammad remained unbeaten seven times in 68 innings of 45 Test matches and scored 2705 runs at an average of 44.34. It included 7 centuries and 13 half-centuries. His highest individual score was 203 not out. Similarly, he remained unbeaten six times in 58 innings of 63 ODIs and completed 1269 runs at an average of 24.40. 126 unbeaten was his maximum score of one innings. One century and eight half-centuries were also recovered from his bat. Shoaib Mohammad also played in 211 first-class matches in which he remained unbeaten 44 times in 350 innings and scored 12682 runs at an average of 41.44 with 38 centuries and 57 half-centuries. 208 unbeaten runs was the best score of any one of his innings. Shoaib Mohammad took 5 wickets in Test matches, 20 in ODIs and 45 in First Class matches. He also caught 22 catches in Test matches, 13 in ODIs and 93 catches in First Class matches

References

1961 births
Living people
Pakistan One Day International cricketers
Cricketers at the 1987 Cricket World Cup
Pakistan Test cricketers
Karachi cricketers
Pakistan International Airlines cricketers
Pakistani cricketers
Cricketers from Karachi
Pakistan International Airlines B cricketers
Karachi Blues cricketers
Karachi Whites cricketers
Pakistan Starlets cricketers
Pakistani people of Gujarati descent